Ride the Pink Horse is a 1947 film noir crime film produced by Universal Studios. It was directed by Robert Montgomery, who also stars in it, from a screenplay by Ben Hecht and Charles Lederer, which was based on the 1946 novel of the same title by Dorothy B. Hughes. Thomas Gomez was nominated for a Best Supporting Actor Oscar for his performance.

An army veteran known only as Gagin travels to San Pablo in New Mexico to avenge the death of his wartime buddy. Some of the villagers refer to Gagin as "the man with no place."

Ride the Pink Horse and the noir genre
A common theme in noir films is the post-war disillusionment experienced by many soldiers returning to the peacetime economy, which was mirrored in the sordidness of the urban crime film. In these films a serviceman returns to find his sweetheart unfaithful or a good friend dead. The war continues, but now the antagonism turns with a new viciousness toward American society itself. In Ride the Pink Horse, Gagin's quest to avenge his friend's death leads him to rural New Mexico, an unusual setting for the noir motif more typically associated with corrupt urban environments.

Plot

Lucky Gagin (Robert Montgomery) arrives on a bus in San Pablo, a small rural town in New Mexico, during its annual fiesta. He plans to confront and blackmail a mobster named Frank Hugo (Fred Clark) as retribution for the death of his best friend Shorty. He unpacks a Colt .45 pistol from his luggage, sticks it in his waistband, places a check which incriminates Hugo in locker 250, and hides the locker key behind a framed map in the bus depot waiting room using a piece of chewing gum.

Because of the fiesta, Gagin cannot find a room at the hotel by the bus station. He is directed to the non-tourist side of the town. At the merry-go-round there, he meets Pila (Wanda Hendrix), who takes him to the La Fonda Hotel and gives him a "charm of Ishtam" that she says will protect him.

At the hotel, Gagin uses a ruse to find out that Frank Hugo is in room 315. Gagin comes, uninvited, into the hotel room, and proceeds to knock out Jonathan (Richard Gaines), Hugo's private secretary. Marjorie Lundeen (Andrea King), a sophisticated female acquaintance of Hugo's, comes in and uses her wiles trying to learn more about him. When the telephone rings, Gagin answers and impersonates a bell boy. Speaking with Hugo, he learns that Hugo will not be there that day. Gagin leaves the room and in the hotel lobby, he is accosted by FBI agent Bill Retz (Art Smith). In his conversation with Gagin, Retz recounts the plot so far.  Retz takes Gagin to lunch and tells Gagin to lay off with his plot for revenge on Frank Hugo.

Still looking for a room, Gagin ends up at the Cantina de las Tres Violetas, where Pila is inexplicably sitting outside. Going inside, Gagin finds himself to be the only non-Hispanic in the bar. He buys himself a large whiskey and pays for it with a twenty-dollar bill. The barkeep can only make change for ten dollars and the situation is resolved by Pancho (Thomas Gomez), who proposes that Gagin buy ten dollars' worth of drinks for everyone in the bar.

Gagin, having spent twenty dollars at the bar, accompanies Pancho back to his tiovivo (carousel) where Pancho puts him up for the night. Pila arrives at the merry-go-round and ends up sleeping in one of the seats on the carousel. Retz also shows up and warns Gagin of the toughs and tells him that if he could readily find Gagin, so will the toughs.

The next morning, Gagin goes back to the hotel where he meets Frank Hugo, who wears a hearing aid. Gagin tells Hugo that he has check number 6431 and proceeds to lay out the blackmail. They agree to meet that evening at the Tip Top Cafe, where Hugo will pay Gagin the thirty thousand dollars for the incriminating check.

Retz meets Gagin and "officially" asks for the evidence, which Gagin refuses to hand over. Gagin takes Pila to lunch and they are interrupted by the arrival of Marjorie Lundeen. She lays out a scheme for how to shake down Frank Hugo for even more money, but Gagin does not go along with Marjorie's plan.

After the lunch, Gagin returns to the bus depot where he retrieves the check and follows the fiesta crowd to the Tip Top Cafe. He meets with Hugo, who is having dinner with his associates.  Hugo tells Gagin that the bank messenger with the money will be late.  Marjorie invites Gagin to dance with her, and in order to not be seen by Hugo, she walks Gagin outside to a dark alley. There, she tells him that there is no messenger, but someone else. The response to Gagin's query as to who is coming is two toughs who jump him. In the ensuing fight, one of them stabs Gagin in the right shoulder with a knife. Retz finds the two toughs in the alley, one dead and one with a broken arm, and confronts Hugo at the dining table. While the police search the area, Pila finds Gagin in the bushes, pulls the knife out of his back, and together they make their way back to Pancho and the merry-go-round.

Two toughs come to the tiovivo. With Gagin hidden in one of the seats by Pila, and children riding the carousel, the toughs proceed to severely beat Pancho, who does not divulge the presence of Gagin. Gagin, whose health and mental state are failing, agrees to go with Pila back by bus to her village of San Melo. While they are waiting in the Tres Violetas, Gagin gives the check to Pila, who hides it in her bustier. They are found by Locke and Marjorie Lundeen. When Locke approaches the now passed out Gagin, Pila hits him with a bottle and they make their escape, leaving Marjorie to find Locke lying on the floor the cantina.

Gagin makes his way back to the La Fonda Hotel, where Pila finds him outside room 315. The door is opened by one of Hugo's toughs and the duo is brought into the room, where Frank Hugo, Marjorie Lundeen, Jonathan, and the two toughs are present. Hugo begins to question the now incoherent Gagin, who does not remember where the check is. He is beaten by one of the toughs, who then proceed to also beat Pila. Retz arrives, disarms the toughs, breaks Hugo's hearing aid, and ultimately gets the check from Gagin.

At a two-dollar breakfast the next day with Retz, Gagin refuses to eat. Retz tells Gagin that he should say goodbye to Pila and Pancho, and together they return to the merry go round. Gagin bids adieu to Pancho, and then, uncomfortably, to Pila, to whom he returns the Ishtam charm. As Retz and Gagin leave, Pila, who had been somewhat of an outcast with her peers, is surrounded by them. She recounts the story of her adventure and realizes that now she is the center of attention  among her group.

Cast
 Robert Montgomery as Gagin
 Thomas Gomez as Pancho
 Rita Conde as Carla
 Iris Flores as Maria
 Wanda Hendrix as Pila
 Grandon Rhodes as Mr. Edison
 Tito Rebaldo as Bellboy
 Richard Gaines as Jonathan
 Andrea King as Marjorie 
 Art Smith as Bill Retz
 Martin Garralaga as Barkeeper 
 Edward Earle as Locke
 Harold Goodwin as Red 
 Maria Cortez as Elevator Girl
 Fred Clark as Hugo

Production notes
The antique "Tio Vivo Carousel" built in 1882 in Taos, New Mexico, was the model for the carousel in the novel Ride The Pink Horse. It was purchased by the producers and shipped to the set of Universal where it was reconstructed for use in the film. The burning of the Zozobra ("Old Man Gloom") effigy during the Fiestas de Santa Fe sets the time of the events in the film in early September. Part of the movie was filmed at the La Fonda Hotel in Santa Fe.

Other adaptations 
A 1947 Lux Radio Theater adaptation with Montgomery and Hendrix can be heard at the Internet Archive.
In 1950 the story was adapted using the same title for Robert Montgomery Presents TV series.
The film was remade as the 1964 TV movie The Hanged Man, directed by Don Siegel.

Reception
According to Variety, the film earned less than $2 million at the box office.

Bosley Crowther, film critic for The New York Times, liked the film, especially Robert Montgomery's direction, and wrote:

Crowther also praised the work of Fred Clark and Wanda Hendrix.

Awards
Nominations
 Academy Awards: Oscar; Best Actor in a Supporting Role, Thomas Gomez; 1948.

References

External links
 
 
 
 
Ride the Pink Horse: Bad Luck All Around an essay by Michael Almereyda at the Criterion Collection

1947 films
1940s crime thriller films
American crime thriller films
American black-and-white films
Film noir
Films based on American novels
Films directed by Robert Montgomery (actor)
Films set in New Mexico
Universal Pictures films
Films with screenplays by Ben Hecht
Films with screenplays by Charles Lederer
Films shot in New Mexico
Films scored by Frank Skinner
Films based on works by Dorothy B. Hughes
1940s American films